Eskişehir Demirspor is a Turkish sports club from Eskişehir, Turkey. They are the oldest football club in Eskişehir. The club has many departments including football, basketball, volleyball, athletic, swimming, fencing, wrestling, and karate. They are famous with their football department and have won the Turkish Football Championship in 1940.

Honours
 Turkish Football Championship
 Winners (1): 1940
 Third place (2): 1946, 1949

 Eskişehir Football League
 Winners (22) (record): 1933-34, 1934-35, 1936-37, 1937-38, 1938-39, 1939-40, 1940-41, 1941-42, 1942-43, 1943-44, 1944-45, 1945-46, 1946-47, 1947-48, 1948-49, 1951-52, 1952-53, 1953-54, 1954-55, 1955-56, 1956-57, 1957-58

External links
 Official Website 
 Club profile at tff.org 

Football clubs in Turkey
Multi-sport clubs in Turkey
Sport in Eskişehir
Association football clubs established in 1930
Railway association football teams
1930 establishments in Turkey